Dmitry Petrovich Gerasimenko (born 29 September 1978) is a Russian businessman, ex-owner of steel company Krasny Oktyabr Closed Joint-Stock Company and of basketball clubs BC Krasny Oktyabr and Pallacanestro Cantù.

Biography 

Of Ukrainian origin, Gerasimenko became a multimillionaire thanks to steel (actually he owns Krasny Oktyabr Closed Joint-Stock Company, the second largest steelmill in Russia) and gas.

In 2012 he founded the club of the same name of the factory, who got a wild card for the VTB United League.

In November 2015 has also acquired 65% of the shares of Pallacanestro Cantù.

References 

Living people
1978 births
Russian businesspeople
Basketball executives
Businesspeople in steel
People from Volgograd